WPRA (990 AM) is a radio station broadcasting a Spanish Variety format. Licensed to Mayaguez, Puerto Rico, it serves the Puerto Rico area.  The station is currently owned by Empresas Bechara through its licensee, WPRA, Inc.

During 1958, 15 year old actor Adrian Garcia made his acting debut at this radio station, beginning what would be a prolific acting career in radio, film, television and theater.

References

External links

PRA
Radio stations established in 1937
PRA
1937 establishments in Puerto Rico